Hayley Marie Norman is an American actress, writer, and creator best known for her roles in Kenan, A.P. Bio, Hancock, Chris Rock's Top Five, Adam Ruins Everything, Fired Up!, and Norbit.

Norman has written, produced, and starred in a number of online videos and sketches that have been featured by Funny or Die and collectively garnered millions of views. The digital series she produced and starred in, Hello Cupid, was accepted into Tribeca Film Festival and picked up by BET in 2015.

Early life
Norman signed with her first agency at seven years old after being spotted in a restaurant by Cindy Crawford. She traveled extensively to pursue modeling, acting, and even modeled regularly for Mattel, doing a series of ads for the African-American Barbie doll.

Norman is a graduate of the American Academy of Dramatic Arts in Los Angeles. She was also a house team performer and writer at the Upright Citizens Brigade Theater.

Career

2006–2010
In 2006, Norman joined the game show Deal or No Deal as Case Model #25. She remained on the show for three seasons while taking time off to act in various projects, including roles in Norbit and Hancock.

In 2008, she had a recurring role on the Starz original series Crash.  The following year, Norman appeared in the Screen Gems high school comedy Fired Up, for which Roger Ebert praised her performance as Angela, stating that she was "the most intriguing member of the cast".

2011–2016
In 2011, made guest star appearances on shows like CSI: Miami. 

In 2014, two feature films Norman acted in, Top Five and Beyond the Lights, both premiered at the 2014 Toronto International Film Festival.

Hello Cupid, the web series that Norman produced and starred in, was accepted into Tribeca Film Festival in 2015. The semi-scripted series from Black&Sexy TV drew largely from Norman's improv, and comedy skills and was spotlighted by Vulture, Teen Vogue, and more.

Norman also starred in the Das Racist music video for "Girl" in 2012.

2017-present
In 2018, she had a recurring role on the Freeform series Alone Together and appeared in the CBS sitcom Living Biblically.

In February 2018, Norman booked a series regular role in the CW pilot Dead Inside from executive producer Bill Lawrence.

In August 2018, Norman was asked to join the cast of NBC Universal's Access Live and Access Hollywood as a special guest host.

In 2019, she starred in the Richard Bates, Jr. film Tone-Deaf, which premiered at SXSW, which also starred Amanda Crew and Robert Patrick.

In 2021, it was announced that Norman will be a recurring cast member on the hit Peacock sitcom A.P. Bio.

In 2021, it was announced that Norman had joined the cast of NBC's Kenan, playing opposite Kenan Thompson.

Activism 
Norman is a human rights activist, regularly touring the country as part of the Black History Mobile Museum speaking about gender, race, and Hollywood. Norman also espouses animal rights, and works with a number of organizations to promote veganism and cruelty-free living.

Selected filmography

Film

Television

References

External links
 

Living people
Actresses from Los Angeles
American female models
American people of Russian descent
American people of German descent
American Academy of Dramatic Arts alumni
African-American actresses
People from Agoura Hills, California
American television actresses
21st-century American actresses
American child actresses
Year of birth missing (living people)
21st-century African-American women
21st-century African-American people